The Hawaiʻi national football team is a team representing the people of the Hawaiian Islands, located in the central Pacific Ocean and part of the United States. They are not affiliated with FIFA, Concacaf or OFC, and therefore cannot compete for the FIFA World Cup, the CONCACAF Gold Cup or the OFC Nations Cup. Instead, they are part of ConIFA and compete in their competitions.

Hui Kanaka Pōwāwae

The Hui Kanaka Pōwāwae is the football association of Hawaiʻi.

History
Hawaiʻi joined ConIFA on November 28, 2019, under the principle that "Hawaiʻi is a sovereign nation-state in continuity, under prolonged occupation by the United States."

See also
Hawaiian sovereignty movement
Hawaiian Kingdom

References 

Oceanian national and official selection-teams not affiliated to FIFA
North American national and official selection-teams not affiliated to FIFA
Soccer in Hawaii
CONIFA member associations